Miss International 1963, the 4th Miss International pageant, was held on 16 August 1963 at the Long Beach Municipal Auditorium, Long Beach, California, United States. 46 contestants competed for the pageant. Gudrun Bjarnadóttir from Iceland was crowned as Miss International 1963 by outgoing titleholder, Tania Verstak from Australia.

Results

Placements

Special Awards

Contestants 

  - Joyce Bryan
  - Susana Cukar Cuhan
  - Tricia Reschke
  - Xenia Doppler
  - Monique Bourgeois
  - Maria Lozada
  - Tânia Franco da Souza
  - Marlene Leeson
  - Christina Selvanayagam
  - Martha Restrepo González
  - Birgitte Heiberg
  - Norma Guzmán Simó
  - Tania Valle Moreno
  - Diane Westbury
  - Anneli Rautala
  - Marie-Josée LeCocq
  - Marion Sybille Zota
  - Emi Zanou
  - Hanny IJsebrands
  - Guðrún Bjarnadóttir
  - Olive Ursula White
  - Ester Kfir
  - Anna Rispoli
  - Shizuko Shimizu
  - Doris Haj
  - Choi Yoo-mi
  - Catherine Paulus
  - Andrée Picard
  - Elaine Miscall
  - Claudia Díaz
  - Martha Tunge
  - Mariela Aguirre
  - Maria Quesada
  - Esperanza Moy Ramírez
  - Monina Medinilla Yllana
  - Aida Mercado Cordero
  - Wendy Barrie
  - Martie Claasen
  - Encarnación Zalabardo
  - Riina Krusvik
  - Mareta Tuihaa
  - Gulseren Kocaman
  - Susana Casañas Méndez
  - Norah Duarte
  - Christina Fryer
  West Indies - Joan Martin

Notes

External links
Pageantopolis - Miss International 1963

1963
1963 in California
1963 beauty pageants
Beauty pageants in the United States
20th century in Los Angeles County, California